Since the United States Congress was established with the 1st Congress in 1789, fifteen of its members have been killed while in office, and thirteen have suffered serious injuries from attacks. The members of Congress were either injured or killed by someone intending serious harm, or there is evidence of lethal intent by an unknown assailant (such as the two congressmen who died of the National Hotel disease). The first member of Congress to be killed or wounded in office was Henry Wharton Conway who was killed in a duel in 1827. The most recent death occurred in 1983 when Korean Air Lines Flight 007, carrying Larry McDonald, was shot down over the Pacific Ocean. The most recent Congress member to be injured was Rand Paul who was tackled from behind by his neighbor in 2017.

All of the 15 Congressmen killed in office were male and 10 were Democrats, four were Republicans, and one was a Democratic-Republican. Four members died in duels, and a total of ten (three senators, six members of the House of Representatives, and one territory delegate to the House) died from gunshot wounds.

Thirteen Congress members have been wounded while in office. Six of the wounded were Republicans, five were Democrats, and one member each from the Anti-Jacksonian and Whig parties. One was a woman, and four were senators. Five of those injured were wounded during the 1954 United States Capitol shooting incident.

Lists

Killed 
Party colors:

Wounded 
Party colors:

See also 

 Threatening government officials of the United States     
 United States Congress members who died in office
 List of assassinated American politicians
 List of United States federal judges killed in office
 List of United States presidential assassination attempts and plots

References

Further reading
 
 R. Eric Petersen; Jennifer E. Manning (17 August 2017). Violence Against Members of Congress and Their Staff: Selected Examples and Congressional Responses. Congressional Research Service.

Killed or wounded
Political violence in the United States

US Congress members
Lists of assassinations